Matthew Lee is an American public interest lawyer, author, and founder of two non-profit organizations, Inner City Press and Fair Finance Watch.

Both are known for their investigations of the banking industry's treatment of low-income communities of color around the world. Lee produces weekly reports on, and advocates concerning, such global banks as HSBC, Citigroup, Royal Bank of Scotland, Mizuho,  and others. 
In 2005-2006, Lee was engaged in litigation to deem the "citizens-only" provision of the Freedom of Information Act of Delaware (and ten other states) to be unconstitutional.

Lee and Fair Finance Watch in October 2013 raised fair lending concerns regarding Mercantile Bank and its proposed acquiring of FirstBank. On November 26, 2013, Michigan Live reported on the challenge and Mercantile telling the Security & Exchange Commission the issues Lee and FFW raised would result in a delay of the merger.

Lee is the author of the non-fiction book Predatory Lending: Toxic Credit in the Global Inner City and the novel Predatory Bender. Lee is also an accredited journalist at the United Nations.

In mid-2006, Lee's investigative journalism at the UN, published online in Inner City Press uncovered and led to the United Nations Development Programme halting its disarmament programs in the Karamoja region of Uganda in response to human rights abuses exposed in the parallel forcible disarmament programs carried out by the Uganda People's Defense Force. For another view, see the Ugandan newspaper The New Vision, which was critical of UNDP's halt of funding.

Lee is also a frequent video discussion guest on BloggingHeads.tv,  discussing things related to United Nations internal operations.

In 2008, Lee appeared on the ninth episode of the sixth season of the show Penn & Teller: Bullshit! . The show discussed "World Peace" and went on a tour that Lee led most of in the UN building. Besides leading the tour, he also discussed some of the actions that the UN takes which are hypocritical, or make little sense.

In 2009, Lee reported extensively on the conflict in Sri Lanka from New York, including critically covering UN Secretary General Ban Ki-moon's visit to the internally displaced persons' camps in Vavuniya in May 2009. In early 2010, Lee was invited to speak on the topic of Sri Lanka at the Rebellious Lawyers' conference at Yale Law School.

Inner City Press' questioning of the UN on when it asked the Syrian government for access to al Ghouta was played on Democracy Now on August 28, from Minute 18:30.

Personal life
Lee was born in Washington, D.C., to parents of Chinese and Anglo descent. His father was in the U.S. Foreign Service. After finishing middle school overseas, Lee attended high school in the US.

See also

Inner City Press
Fair Finance Watch

References

External links
 "A Citizen of the World, At Home in The Bronx," Washington Post, April 17, 2006
 "HSBC 'overcharging' US troops," The Observer (UK), December 18, 2005
 "Wading through the Home Mortgage Disclosure Act Muck," US Banker, November 2005
 Review of Predatory Bender
Another review of Predatory Bender
Video discussions/debates involving Matthew Lee on BloggingHeads.tv
The Beat by Eric Konigsberg (Sept. 26, 2011), The New Yorker
What is Inner City Press? by Tom McGregor (Oct. 17, 2011), UN Post
Trouble in the UN Press Core (June 28, 2012) by Richard Armstrong 'World Policy Review'

American lawyers
Year of birth missing (living people)
Living people
21st-century American novelists
American male novelists
21st-century American male writers
21st-century American non-fiction writers
American male non-fiction writers